Kurt Mahler FRS (26 July 1903, Krefeld, Germany – 25 February 1988, Canberra, Australia) was a German mathematician who worked in the fields of transcendental number theory, diophantine approximation, p-adic analysis, and the geometry of numbers.

Career
Mahler was a student at the universities in Frankfurt and Göttingen, graduating with a Ph.D. from Johann Wolfgang Goethe University of Frankfurt am Main in 1927; his advisor was Carl Ludwig Siegel.
He left Germany with the rise of Adolf Hitler and accepted an invitation by Louis Mordell to go to Manchester. However, at the start of World War II he was interned as an enemy alien in Central Camp in Douglas, Isle of Man, where he met Kurt Hirsch, although he was released after only three months. He became a British citizen in 1946.

Mahler held the following positions:
University of Groningen
 Assistant 1934–1936
University of Manchester
 Assistant Lecturer at 1937–1939, 1941–1944
 Lecturer, 1944–1947; Senior Lecturer, 1948–1949; Reader, 1949–1952
 Professor of Mathematical Analysis, 1952–1963
 Professor of Mathematics, Institute of Advanced Studies, Australian National University, 1963–1968 and 1972–1975
 Professor of Mathematics, Ohio State University, USA, 1968–1972
 Professor Emeritus, Australian National University, from 1975.

Research
Mahler worked in a broad variety of mathematical disciplines, including transcendental number theory, diophantine approximation, p-adic analysis, and the geometry of numbers.

Mahler proved that the Prouhet–Thue–Morse constant and the Champernowne constant 0.1234567891011121314151617181920... are transcendental numbers.

Mahler was the first to give an irrationality measure for pi, in 1953. Although some have suggested the irrationality measure of pi is likely to be 2, the current best estimate is 7.103205334137…, due to Doron Zeilberger and Wadim Zudilin.

Awards
He was elected a member of the Royal Society in 1948 and a member of the Australian Academy of Science in 1965. He was awarded the London Mathematical Society's Senior Berwick Prize in 1950, the De Morgan Medal, 1971, and the Thomas Ranken Lyle Medal, 1977.

Personal life
Mahler spoke fluent Japanese and was an expert photographer.

See also
 Mahler's inequality
 Mahler measure
 Mahler polynomial
 Mahler volume
 Mahler's theorem
 Mahler's compactness theorem
 Skolem–Mahler–Lech theorem

References

External links
 

1903 births
1988 deaths
20th-century German mathematicians
Fellows of the Royal Society
Fellows of the Australian Academy of Science
Mathematical analysts
Ohio State University faculty
German emigrants to Australia
Academics of the Victoria University of Manchester
People from Krefeld
People interned in the Isle of Man during World War II